Ranasur Bista, was a Nepali architect who is considered to be one of the key figures in the building of early Rana palaces of Nepal. Bista is among the pioneer master masons of Nepal in introducing European building style with Traditional Vastu shastra. He is best known for designing and engineering palaces for the first Rana prime minister of Nepal  Jung Bahadur Rana.

Work
Ranasur Bista is mainly credited for building and designing Rana palaces. Some of his major projects are:
Thapathali Durbar
Singha Mahal
Charburja Durbar
Gol Baithak
Narayanhity Palace(Ranodip Singh Kunwar's,but later was demolished)

See also
Rana palaces of Nepal
Thapathali Durbar

References

Nepalese architects